Netty Simons (née Rothenberg) (b. 26 October 1913, d. 1 April 1994) was an American pianist, music editor, music educator and composer.

Biography
Netty Simons was born in New York City and studied music at Third Street Music School. She graduated from New York University where she studied with Marion Bauer and Percy Grainger from 1931 to 1937, and taught at the Third Street Music School from 1928 to 1933. In 1933 she began studies with Alexander Siloti at the Juilliard School of Music, and in 1938 with composer Stefan Wolpe.

From 1961 to 1962 she was producer and coordinator of concerts at Carnegie Hall in New York City. She received a Recording Publication Award from the Ford Foundation in 1971. Her papers are archived at the New York Public Library and the Vassar College Libraries.

Selected works
Songs for Wendy for voice and viola (c.1975)
Quartet
Quartet for Strings
Quintet
Night Sounds for piano
Windfall
Illuminations
Piano Work 1952
2 Dot for 2 Pianos
Trialogue I: The Tombstone Told When She Died for alto, baritone and viola (1963); words by Dylan Thomas
Trialogue II: Myselves Grieve for alto, baritone and viola (1969); words by Dylan Thomas
Trialogue III: Now (Now, Say Nay) for mezzo-soprano, baritone and viola (1973); words by Dylan Thomas
Songs for Jenny
Three Songs (1950)
Design Groups I (1967)
Silver Thaw
Puddintame
Buckeye Has Wings
Too Late, Bridge Is Closed
Great Stream Sile
Facets 2, Trio for flute/piccolo, B-flat clarinet, and double bass
Facets 3 for oboe (or viola) and piano (1962)
Facets 4 for string quartet
Cityscape No. 1
Cityscape No. 2
This Slowly Drifting Cloud
Duo
Circle of Attitudes for violin
Sonata
Quartet for Strings
Summer's Outing for concert band
Journey Sometimes Delayed for concert band
Gate of Hundred Sorrows'''Wild Tales Told On the River Road for clarinet (or bass clarinet) and percussionSummer's Outing for concert band

Simons' works have been recorded and issued on vinyl, including:Music for Young Listeners Classical/Chamber, CRI Records, 1973Donald Erb/J.M. Mestres-Quadreny/Will Ogdon/Netty Simons'' Played by Bertram Turetzky, Desto Records, 1970

References

1913 births
1994 deaths
20th-century classical composers
20th-century American composers
20th-century women composers
20th-century American women musicians
American composers
American classical composers
American women classical composers
American women educators
American music educators
Educators from New York City
Juilliard School alumni
Musicians from New York City
Tisch School of the Arts alumni